Michael Joseph "Mike" Harrington (born September 2, 1936) is an American politician, lawyer and a former U.S. Representative from Massachusetts.

Life and career
Harrington is the son of former State Senator, Salem mayor, and judge Joseph B. Harrington. Harrington graduated from St. John's Preparatory School, in Danvers, Massachusetts, in 1954, then earned a B.A. at Harvard University in 1958 and a J.D. at Harvard Law School in 1961.

After serving on the Salem City Council from 1960 to 1963, Harrington was elected to the Massachusetts State Legislature in 1964, serving until 1969. On September 30, 1969, he won a special election to fill the vacancy caused by the death of U.S. Representative William H. Bates. Harrington defeated Republican state Senator William L. Saltonstall with 52% of the vote. Running in opposition to the Vietnam War, he became the first Democrat to win the 6th Congressional district since 1875. He was subsequently re-elected to four full terms as a Congressman before retiring in 1978.

On July 8, 1975, Rep. Harrington called on House Speaker Carl Albert to convene the Democratic party  committee to examine a secrecy system which he said has covered up "grotesque violations of the law" abroad by the CIA.
At a news conference the Massachusetts Democrat also released three other letters countering efforts in the House to censure him for his role in surfacing the disclosure in 1974 that the CIA spent 11 million dollars (1974 dollars not inflation adjusted) to influence the Chilean political situation.
-(UPI- Washington, July 8, 1975).

Following his retirement from Congress, he became a real estate developer. After a brief run for the Democratic nomination for Massachusetts State Treasurer in 1990, Harrington was charged in 2000 for making false statements to financial institutions, banks, and the Federal Deposit Insurance Corporation. As a result, his law licence was suspended for three years and he was fined $100,000.

Harrington is currently a resident of Beverly, Massachusetts.

He is also a member of the ReFormers Caucus of Issue One.

See also
The Harrington family

References

Footnotes
 

|-

1936 births
Harvard Law School alumni
Democratic Party members of the Massachusetts House of Representatives
Living people
Massachusetts city council members
Democratic Party members of the United States House of Representatives from Massachusetts